Macasinia chorisma is a species of moth of the family Tortricidae. It is found in Puebla, Mexico.

The length of the forewings is 6 mm. The ground colour of the forewings is snow white up to the median fascia, along the costa and on the dorsum beyond the middle. It is suffused with brownish grey beyond the median fascia medially and terminally and marked with a few brown lines. The hindwings are cream, but whiter in the basal half and suffused with brownish in the distal part where brown strigulation (fine streaks) is found.

Etymology
The species name refers to separate position of the species and is derived from choris (meaning separately).

References

Moths described in 2004
Cochylini
Moths of Central America
Taxa named by Józef Razowski